Gymnoscelis daniloi is a moth in the family Geometridae. It occurs on the island of Fogo, Cape Verde. The type location is Portela, Chã das Caldeiras, elevation 1720m. The species was first described in 2009.

Description
The ground colour is pale brown to brown. Both wings have numerous undulate blackish transverse lines.

Etymology
The species is named for Eurico Danilo Montrond, a friend of the discoverer of the species, Eyjolf Aistleitner.

References

Moths described in 2009
Endemic fauna of Cape Verde
daniloi
Moths of Cape Verde
Fauna of Fogo, Cape Verde